The Elfin T350 and T360 were sports racing cars, designed, developed and built by Australian manufacturer Elfin, which were produced in limited numbers to compete in the Australian Sports Car Championship, between 1970 and 1975. They were powered by 2.0 or 2.5-litre Coventry Climax four-cylinder engines, but were also powered by 2.5 to 3.5-litre Repco-Brabham V8 engines.

References

Type 350
Sports racing cars
Cars of Australia